The bombing of the Israeli Consulate and Hakoah Club in Sydney occurred on 23 December 1982. The two bombings occurred on the same day within five hours of each other. The initial case led to a single arrest though charges were later dropped. In 2011, New South Wales Police and Australian Federal Police reopened the case citing new leads. The bombing was one of a number of attacks against that have been conducted against Israeli embassies and diplomats.

Events
On 23 December 1982, at around 2:00pm, an explosive device was detonated near the fire exit door of the Israeli Consulate General on 80 William Street, Sydney. The force of the blast injured two people and significant damage was caused to the consulate building. At around 6.45pm on that same day a second explosive device was detonated inside a vehicle parked outside of the Hakoah Club on 61-67 Hall Street, Bondi, NSW. The bomb did not detonate properly and the resulting explosion injured no one, however, three vehicles were significantly damaged including the one used to store the bomb. The Hakoah Club at the time was filled with a large number of people.

Investigation
Initial police investigations led to the arrest of a 31-year-old man who was charged in relation to the Hakoah Club explosion. The case went before the court, however, charges were later withdrawn by the NSW Attorney General.

Re-investigation
In 2011, the case of the two bombings was reopened after police had discovered new leads. The case was assigned to the Joint Counter Terrorism Team (JCTT) in Sydney, under "Operation Forbearance." The police stated that they "believe there are still people in the community who know those responsible for these bombings."

See also
 Terrorism in Australia

References

Antisemitic attacks and incidents
Antisemitism in Australia
Attacks on diplomatic missions in Australia
Attacks on diplomatic missions of Israel
Australia–Israel relations
Crime in Sydney
1982 crimes in Australia
1980s in Sydney
December 1982 events in Australia
Terrorist incidents in Australia in the 1980s
Terrorist incidents in Oceania in 1982
1980s building bombings